This is a list of films where angels appear:

Angels
 The Christmas Angel (1904)
 The Passing of the Third Floor Back (1935)
 The Green Pastures (1936)
 Here Comes Mr. Jordan (1941)
 Donald's Decision (1942)
 I Married an Angel (1942)
 A Guy Named Joe (1943)
 Cabin in the Sky (1943)
 That's the Spirit (1945)
 The Horn Blows at Midnight (1945)
 A Matter of Life and Death (1946)
 It's a Wonderful Life (1946)
 Down to Earth (1947)
 Heaven Only Knows (1947)
 The Bishop's Wife (1947)
 The Foxy Duckling (1947)
 Johnny Appleseed (1948)
 For Heavens Sake (1950) 
 Angels in the Outfield (1951)
 The Angel Who Pawned Her Harp (1954)
 Carousel (1956)
 Forever, Darling (1956)
 Once Upon a Honeymoon (1956)
 The Story of Mankind (1957)
 The Angel Who Pawned Her Harp (1959)
 The Bible: In the Beginning... (1966)
 The Angel Levine (1970)
 Willie Mays and the Say-Hey Kid (1972)
 The Devil in Miss Jones (1973)
 It Happened One Christmas (1977)
 The Angel and the Woman (1977)
 Heaven Can Wait (1978)
 Christmas Mountain (1981)
 The Angel (1982)
 The Kid with the Broken Halo (1982)
 Two Of A Kind (1983)
 One Magic Christmas (1985) 
 The Heavenly Kid (1985)
 Date with an Angel (1987)       
 Made in Heaven (1987)
 Wings of Desire (1987)
 All Dogs Go to Heaven (1989)
 Always (1989) 
 Chances Are (1989) 
 Almost an Angel (1990)
 Clarence (1990) 
 Bill & Ted's Bogus Journey (1991)
 Faraway, So Close! (1993) 
 Heart and Souls (1993)
 Angels in the Outfield (1994)
 All Dogs Go to Heaven 2 (1996)
 Michael (1996)
 The Preacher's Wife (1996)
 Unlikely Angel (1996)
 A Life Less Ordinary (1997)
 Angels in the Endzone (1997)
 An All Dogs Christmas Carol (1998)
 City of Angels (1998)
 What Dreams May Come (1998)
 A Season for Miracles (1999)
 Dogma (1999)
 Angels in the Infield (2000)
 Little Nicky (2000)
 The Legend of Bagger Vance (2000)
 A Town Without Christmas (2001) 
 Delivering Milo (2001)
 Down to Earth (2001)
 Gabriel & Me (2001)
 Three Days (2001)
 Finding John Christmas (2003) 
 Angel Wars (2004)
 Christmas at Water's Edge (2004)
 Deuteronomium - Der Tag des jüngsten Gerichts (2004)
 When Angels Come to Town (2004)
 Angel-A (2005)
 Angel of the Lord (2005)
 Elizabethtown (2005)
 A Prairie Home Companion (2006)
 Ángeles S.A. (2007)
 Gabriel (2007)
 Pokémon: Giratina and the Sky Warrior (2008)
 The Vintner's Luck (2009)
 Christmas Cupid (2010)
 Legion (2010)
 Passion Play (2010)
 What If... (2010)
 Pak! Pak! My Dr. Kwak! (2011)
 The Adjustment Bureau (2011)
 Noah (2014)
 The Night Before (2015)
 Angel of the Lord 2 (2016)
 Fallen (2016)
 Angry Angel (2017)
 Buttons: A Christmas Tale (2018)
 The Asian Angel (2021)

Fallen/dark angels
 Liliom (1930)
 Liliom (1934)
 Dark Angel: The Ascent (1994)
 The Prophecy (1995)
 Spawn (1997)
 Fallen (1998)
 The Prophecy II (1998)
 The Prophecy 3: The Ascent (2000)
 Van Helsing (2004)
 Van Helsing: The London Assignment (2004)
 Constantine (2005)
 The Prophecy: Uprising (2005)
 The Prophecy: Forsaken (2005)
 Click (2006)
 Ghost Rider (2007)
 Dante's Inferno: An Animated Epic (2010)
 Legion (2010)
 Ghost Rider: Spirit of Vengeance (2012)

See also
 List of angels in fiction
 List of films about demons

References

 
Angel